Tetraneura is a genus of woolly and gall-making aphids in the family Aphididae. There are more than thirty described species in Tetraneura.

Species
These 37 species belong to the genus Tetraneura:

 Tetraneura aequiunguis Zhang, Guangxue & Wanyu Zhang, 1991 c g
 Tetraneura africana van-der van der Goot, 1912 c
 Tetraneura africana Goot, 1912 g
 Tetraneura agnesii Del Guercio, 1921 c g
 Tetraneura akinire c g
 Tetraneura asymmachia Zhang, Guangxue & Wanyu Zhang, 1991 c g
 Tetraneura basui Hille Ris Lambers, 1970 c g
 Tetraneura brachytricha Zhang, Guangxue & Wanyu Zhang, 1991 c g
 Tetraneura caerulescens c g
 Tetraneura capitata Zhang, Guangxue & Wanyu Zhang, 1991 c g
 Tetraneura changaica c g
 Tetraneura chinensis c g
 Tetraneura chui Zhang, Guangxue & Wanyu Zhang, 1991 c g
 Tetraneura fusiformis c g
 Tetraneura indica c g
 Tetraneura iriensis c g
 Tetraneura javensis van-der van der Goot, 1917 c
 Tetraneura javensis Goot, 1917 g
 Tetraneura kalimpongensis Raychaudhuri, D.N., Pal & M.R. Ghosh, 1978 c g
 Tetraneura lambersi Chakrabarti, Samiran & Maity, 1978 c g
 Tetraneura longisetosa c g
 Tetraneura multisetosa Raychaudhuri, D.N., Pal & M.R. Ghosh, 1978 c g
 Tetraneura paiki Hille Ris Lambers, 1970 c g
 Tetraneura persicina Zhang, Guangxue & Wanyu Zhang, 1991 c g
 Tetraneura polychaeta Hille Ris Lambers, 1970 c g
 Tetraneura polychorema Zhang, Guangxue, 1997 c g
 Tetraneura pumilae c g
 Tetraneura radicicola c g
 Tetraneura reticulata Del Guercio, 1921 c g
 Tetraneura sikkimensis Raychaudhuri, D.N., Pal & M.R. Ghosh, 1978 c g
 Tetraneura sorini Hille Ris Lambers, 1970 c g
 Tetraneura triangula Zhang, Guangxue & Wanyu Zhang, 1991 c g
 Tetraneura ulmi (Linnaeus, 1758) c g b (elm sack gall aphid)
 Tetraneura ulmicema Zhang, Guangxue, 1997 c g
 Tetraneura ulmoides c g
 Tetraneura utpali Chakrabarti, Samiran, Maity & D.K. Bhattacharya, 1 c g
 Tetraneura yezoensis c g

Data sources: i = ITIS, c = Catalogue of Life, g = GBIF, b = Bugguide.net

References

Further reading

External links

Eriosomatinae
Sternorrhyncha genera
Insect pests of millets
Taxa named by Theodor Hartig